Paolo Guzzi, born in 1940, is an Italian poet and critic.

Works

Consumo pro capite, Trevi, Rome, 1973
Moduli di trasformazione, foreword by Fabio Doplicher, Carte Segrete, Rome, 1980
Continuum. 1983-1984, Lucarini, Rome, 1985
Magazzini generali n. 5, a booklet with Raffaella Spera and Antonio Spagnuolo), 1987
Dizionario inverso, foreword by Lamberto Pignotti, Il Ventaglio, Rome, 1991
Ecografie, Campanotto, Udine, 1999
Teatro e no, Giubbe Rosse, Florence, 2004

External links
Teatro e no at the publisher's website 

1940 births
Living people
Italian poets
Italian male poets